The Penn State Nittany Lions women's hockey team will represent Penn State University in the 2012–13 NCAA Division I women's ice hockey season. Junior Taylor Gross will be the team captain.

Offseason
May 31: Incoming junior transfer Taylor Gross (from the Connecticut Huskies) has been named team captain.

Recruiting

Exhibition

Regular season

News and notes

Standings

Schedule

Roster

Awards and honors

Team awards

References

Penn State